Camp Dwyer was a military camp formerly of the United States Marine Corps located within the Helmand River Valley southwest of Garmsir in Garmsir District, Helmand Province, Afghanistan.

History

The base was originally a forward operating base however in May 2009 it was expanded into a Camp by Naval Mobile Construction Battalion 5 (NMCB 5), it was further expanded by NMCB 3 in November 2011.

The base was named after British Lance Bombardier James Dwyer (1984-2006), of 29th Commando Regiment Royal Artillery, who was killed on Wednesday 27 December 2006, aged 22, when the vehicle he was driving struck an anti-tank mine while on a patrol in southern Helmand Province.

The base was a major USMC installation and one of the largest camps the Marines used in Southern Helmand.  Immediately adjacent to, and connected to the Marine base was an installation known as Camp Gamsir which was the headquarters of the 1st Brigade 215th Corps. Some Marines lived on this smaller Afghan base as part of a training detail.

The base has been significantly reduced in physical size and number of personal assigned. As of January 2014 about 700 military and civilian personnel are at the base. And the base size has been reduced to about 1,400 acres.

Units
Afghan units
•   Afghan National Army (ANA)

Jordanian Unit
•   2012

British units
Operation Herrick 5 - 
 Elements of 4 Logistic Support Regiment, 60 Close Support Sqn, Royal Logistic Corps
 One troop of light guns from 29th Commando Regiment Royal Artillery
Operation Herrick 7 - Household Cavalry Regiment Battlegroup HQ
 4th Regiment Royal Artillery, Lawson Troop.

American units
 2nd Brigade, 87th Infantry Regiment, 10th Mountain Division October 2018-July 2019
 Georgia Army National Guard Police Mentor Team "Falcon", January 2008-May 2008
 809th Expeditionary RED HORSE Squadron
 Operation Asada Wosa. Battalion Landing Team 1st Battalion, 6th Marines, Reinforced March - October 2008.
 Operation Eastern Storm. 1st Battalion, 6th Marines between July 2011 and January 2012
 Detachment of Naval Mobile Construction Battalion Seven during December 2008.
 2nd Battalion 8th Marines during July 2009.
 Regimental Combat Team 3 between June 2009 - October 2009 commanded by Col. Duffy White.
 Regimental Combat Team 7 (RCT 7) between September 2009 and September 2010.
 Company B, Det-B of 2nd Assault Amphibian Battalion during December 2009.
 Naval Mobile Construction Battalion Five between December 2008 - September 2009 led by Officer in Charge LT Gregory Woods
 Naval Mobile Construction Battalion Three between November 2010 - January 2011.
 RCT 1 between September 2010 and July 2011
 RCT 5 between August 2011 and July 2012 commanded by Col. Roger Turner
 2nd Battalion, 10th Marines between May 2012 and September 2012
 RCT 7 between September 2012 and July 2013 commanded by Col. Austin Renforth.
 3rd Battalion, 9th Marines between October 2012 and May 2013
 Elements of 2nd Battalion 8th Marines between July 2013 and October 2013.
 Combat Logistics Battalion 8 between May 2009 and October 2009
 Combat Logistics Battalion 1 between Oct 2009 and May 2010
 Combat Logistics Battalion 5 between April 2010 and October 2010
 Combat Logistics Battalion 3 between Aug 2010 and May 2011
 Combat Logistics Battalion 1 between Oct 2011 and May 2012
 31st Combat Support Hospital March 2010 and January 2011
Elements of Retrograde Redeployment Reset and Reconstitution Operations Group (R4OG-12.1 (First successful operation)) From May 2012 through Dec 2012.
Combat Logistics Battalion 5 providing logistical support for R4OG from April 2012 and August 2012.
Elements of Retrograde Redeployment Reset and Reconstitution Operations Group (R4OG) From 13 Jun 2014 through 28 Oct 2012.
Elements of 82nd Division (United States) 1st Brigade, 2/504 PIR From July 2017 through March 2018.
1st Battalion, 178th Infantry Regiment (Illinois Army National Guard) consisting of Headquarters and Headquarters Co, A Co, B Co, C Co and D Co from 16 Dec 2019 through March 31 2020.
921st Contingency Response Squadron April 2021 through Unknown 2021.
Permanently closed down Dwyer.

Danish units
 One troop of ARTHUR (Artillery hunting radar) Danish Artillery Regiment Early march 2007

Aviation assets
 Unknown Company, HMLA-169 during September 2009 (UH-1N).
 Unknown Company, HMLA-367 between January and February 2010 (AH-1W).
 Unknown Company, HMLA-169 during December 2010 (AH-1W).
 Unknown Company, HMLA-269 during June 2011 (AH-1W).
 Unknown Company, HMLA-469 between October and November 2012 (AH-1W & UH-1Y).
VMU-3 between March 2011 and November 2011 (RQ-7B).
 Elements of 82nd Combat Aviation Brigade between 2009 and 2010.
 Company B, 5th Battalion, 101st Aviation Regiment, 101st Combat Aviation Brigade "Lancers" from March 2010 - February 2011.
 Company C, 1st Battalion, 214th Aviation Regiment, "Weizen Dust-Off" from August 2010 to August 2011 (UH-60A).
 Elements of 159th Combat Aviation Brigade between 2011 and 2012.
 Elements of 25th Combat Aviation Brigade between 2012 and 2013.
 Company F, 1st Battalion (General Support), 169th Aviation Regiment DUSTOFF from 2012 to 2013
 Elements of VMU-2 between June 2009 - November 2009 (RQ-7B Shadow) & October 2013 - May 2014 (Scan Eagle)

See also
History of the United States Marine Corps
List of United States Marine Corps installations
List of ISAF installations in Afghanistan

References

Citations

Bibliography

Buildings and structures in Helmand Province
Military installations of the United States in Afghanistan
Dwyer
United States Marine Corps in the War in Afghanistan (2001–2021)
Military installations established in the 2000s
2009 establishments in Afghanistan
2021 disestablishments in Afghanistan